Medhafushi as a place name may refer to:
 Medhafushi (Haa Alif Atol) (Republic of Maldives)
 Medhafushi (Laamu Atoll) (Republic of Maldives)
 Medhafushi (Lhaviyani Atoll) (Republic of Maldives)
 Medhafushi (Noonu Atoll) (Republic of Maldives)
 Medhafushi (Thaa Atoll) (Republic of Maldives)
 Medhafushi (Alif Dhaal Atoll) (Republic of Maldives)